Courts of Kentucky include:
;Kentucky Court of Justice
Under an amendment to the Kentucky Constitution passed by the state's voters in 1975, judicial power in Kentucky is "vested exclusively in one Court of Justice", divided into the following:
Kentucky Supreme Court
Kentucky Court of Appeals
Kentucky Circuit Courts (57 circuits)
Kentucky District Courts (60 judicial districts)

;Federal courts located in this state
United States District Court for the Eastern District of Kentucky
United States District Court for the Western District of Kentucky

;Former federal courts of Kentucky
United States District Court for the District of Kentucky (extinct, subdivided)

References

External links
National Center for State Courts – directory of state court websites.

Courts in the United States